Derek Willis (born June 21, 1995) is an American basketball player for Reyer Venezia of the Italian Lega Basket Serie A (LBA) and the EuroCup. He played college basketball for the Kentucky Wildcats.

Early life
Willis is one of a relatively small number of Native Americans who have played in NCAA Division I basketball. His mother is a member of three tribes—Southern Arapaho, Pawnee, and Muscogee. Although born in Louisville, Kentucky, he lived with his family for several years during his childhood on the Wind River Indian Reservation in Wyoming. According to Fox Sports writer Reid Forgrave, "His favorite childhood memories are from that reservation." The family eventually returned to the Louisville area, settling in the city of Mount Washington.

High school career
As a 6'9 200 lbs senior at Bullitt East High School, Willis averaged 17.4 points and 9.4 rebounds per game. While at Bullitt East, he regularly traveled around the U.S. for both AAU basketball and Yu-Gi-Oh! tournaments; according to his father, "Derek was the only kid in the nation who was nationally ranked in basketball and in Yu-Gi-Oh!"

College career
Willis was the first player to commit to Kentucky’s 2013–14 recruiting class, choosing UK over Indiana, Louisville and Purdue. He appeared in 103 games over his four-year career with the Wildcats, turning in averages of 5.4 points and 3.4 rebounds per contest, while making 108 of his 271 shots taken from three-point territory in his college career. Willis won the SEC tournament with the Wildcats in 2015, 2016 and 2017, advancing to the NCAA Final Four in 2015. He proposed to his girlfriend on senior night, prior to Kentucky's home game against Vanderbilt.

In April 2017, he attended the Portsmouth Invitational Tournament in Portsmouth, Virginia.

Professional career

Grand Rapids Drive (2017–2018) 
After going undrafted, Willis was signed by the Detroit Pistons of the NBA as a part of their training camp roster, before being reassigned to the Pistons' G League affiliate Grand Rapids Drive. In his professional debut on November 3, 2017, he provided the game-winning tip-in in Grand Rapids' 86-85 victory over the Erie BayHawks. Making 43 G League appearances (38 starts) as a first-year player, Willis averaged 11.8 points and 6.9 rebounds per contest.

BG Göttingen (2018–2019) 
In late July 2018, Willis inked a deal with BG Göttingen of the German Basketball Bundesliga. He saw action in 34 Bundesliga games, averaging 12.0 points and 5.0 rebounds per contest for the "Violets".

Ratiopharm Ulm (2019–2020) 
On July 22, 2019, he signed a two-year deal with German Bundesliga outfit Ratiopharm Ulm, known as "The Sparrows." Willis averaged 7.9 points and 4.8 rebounds per game during the 2019-20 season.

Happy Casa Brindisi (2020–2021) 
On July 17, 2020, he has signed with Happy Casa Brindisi of the Lega Basket Serie A.

Club Joventut Badalona (2021–2022) 
On July 14, 2021, Willis signed with Club Joventut Badalona of the Liga ACB.

Reyer Venezia (2022–present) 
On July 13, 2022, Willis signed with Reyer Venezia of the Lega Basket Serie A (LBA).

International career
Willis was a member of the US team that competed at the 2012 Albert Schweitzer Tournament. In February 2018, he was named to the USA squad for the 2019 World Cup qualifiers.

References

External links 
 Kentucky Wildcats bio
 Profile at eurobasket.com

1995 births
Living people
American expatriate basketball people in Germany
American expatriate basketball people in Italy
American men's basketball players
Basketball players from Louisville, Kentucky
BG Göttingen players
Forwards (basketball)
Grand Rapids Drive players
Joventut Badalona players
Kentucky Wildcats men's basketball players
Lega Basket Serie A players
Native American basketball players
New Basket Brindisi players
Ratiopharm Ulm players
Reyer Venezia players
United States men's national basketball team players